The FIFA Women's World Rankings for football were introduced in 2003, with the first rankings published on 16 July of that year, as a follow-on to the existing Men's FIFA World Rankings. They attempt to compare the strength of internationally active women's national teams at any given time. As of the start of 2023, the ranking has 185 national teams.

Specifics of the ranking system
FIFA Women's World Rankings are based on every international match a team ever played, dating back to 1971, the first FIFA-recognized women's international between France and the Netherlands.
FIFA Women's World Rankings are implicitly weighted to emphasize recent results.
FIFA Women's World Rankings are only published four times a year. Normally, rankings are released in March, June, September and December. (In World Cup years, dates may be adjusted to reflect the World Cup results.)

The first two points result from the FIFA Women's World Rankings system being based on the Elo rating system adjusted for football; in 2018, FIFA modified the men's ranking system to similarly be based on Elo systems after continued criticism. FIFA considers the ratings for teams with fewer than 5 matches provisional and at the end of the list. In addition, any team that plays no matches for 4 years becomes unranked; this inactivity limit was previously 18 months, but was extended in early 2021 (after the COVID-19 pandemic stifled a significant amount of international play).

Leaders

To date the United States and Germany have been the only two teams to lead the women's rankings. They have also held the top two spots in all but six releases, when Germany was ranked third (only Norway, Brazil, England and Sweden have been ranked second during this time).

The United States holds the record for the longest consecutive period leading the rankings of nearly 7 years, from March 2008 to December 2014. As of January 2022, the United States has led for a total of 14 years, Germany for 4.5 years, and the two jointly led for 3 months.

Ranking procedure
The rankings are based on the following formulae:

Where

The average points of all teams are about 1300 points. The top nations usually exceed 2000 points. In order to be ranked, a team must have played at least 5 matches against officially ranked teams, and have not been inactive for more than 18 months. Even if teams are not officially ranked, their points rating is kept constant until they play their next match.

Actual result of the match
The main component of the actual result is whether the team wins, loses, or draws, but goal difference is also taken into account.

If the match results in a winner and loser, the loser is awarded a percentage given by the accompanying table, with the result always less than or equal to 20% (for goal differences greater than zero). The result is based on the goal difference and the number of goals they scored. The remaining percentage points are awarded to the winner.  For example, a 2–1 match has the result awarded 84%–16% respectively, a 4–3 match has the result awarded 82%–18%, and an 8–3 match has the result awarded 96.2%–3.8%.  As such, it is possible for a team to lose points even if they win a match, assuming they did not "win by enough".

If the match ends in a draw the teams are awarded the same result, but the number depends on the goals scored so the results will not necessarily add up to 100%.  For example, a 0–0 draws earns both teams 47% each, a 1–1 draw earns 50% each, and a 4–4 draw earns 52.5% each.

Actual result table

Source

Neutral ground or Home vs. Away
Historically, home teams earn 66% of the points available to them, with away teams earning the other 34%.  To account for this, when two teams are not playing on neutral ground, the home team has its  inflated by 100 points for the purposes of calculation.  That is, if two equally ranked teams playing at one team's home ground, the home team would be expected to win at the same rate a team playing on neutral ground with a 100-point advantage.  This 100 point difference corresponds to a 64%–36% advantage in terms of expected result. The scaling factor remains the same (c=200).

Importance of the match

Ranking schedule
Rankings are generally published four times a year.

See also

FIFA Men's World Rankings
Elo football rating
Statistical association football predictions
Geography of women's association football

References

External links
 FIFA/Coca-Cola Women's World Ranking at FIFA.com
 Women's World Ranking Procedure at FIFA.com
 Women’s World Ranking Fact Sheet

Women's association football
Association football rankings
Sports world rankings
FIFA